Giuseppe de Carolis (1652–1742) was a Roman Catholic prelate who served as Bishop of Aquino e Pontecorvo (1725–1742) and Bishop of Aquino (1699–1725).

Biography
Giuseppe de Carolis was born on 5 Oct 1699 in Pofi, Italy.
On 5 Oct 1699, he was appointed during the papacy of Pope Innocent XII as Bishop of Aquino.
On 11 Oct 1699, he was consecrated bishop by Pier Matteo Petrucci, Cardinal-Priest of San Marcello al Corso, with Giovanni Andrea Monreale, Archbishop of Reggio Calabria, and 
Tommaso Guzzoni, Bishop of Sora, serving as co-consecrators. 
On 23 Jun 1725, he was appointed during the papacy of Pope Benedict XIII as Bishop of Aquino e Pontecorvo after the diocese was merged with the Diocese of Aquino.
On 13 Jul 1725, he was named Titular Archbishop of Tyana.
He served as Bishop of Aquino e Pontecorvo until his death on 5 Jan 1742.

References

External links and additional sources
 (for Chronology of Bishops) 
 (for Chronology of Bishops) 
 (for Chronology of Bishops) 
 (for Chronology of Bishops) 

18th-century Italian Roman Catholic bishops
Bishops appointed by Pope Innocent XII
Bishops appointed by Pope Benedict XIII
1652 births
1742 deaths